Beach Cities is a nickname for the coastal area of Los Angeles County comprising the oceanfront cities of Manhattan Beach, Hermosa Beach, and Redondo Beach, located on the south end of the Santa Monica Bay west and south of downtown Los Angeles, north of the Palos Verdes Peninsula on the Pacific Ocean in Southern California. Neighboring Torrance also shares a strip of beach property in the South Bay, but is generally excluded from the group.

The three cities share public agencies including the Beach Cities Transit District (with El Segundo) and the Beach Cities Health District.

All three are known for their beaches and municipal piers. They are popular with swimmers, surfers, bodyboarders, and other beachgoers.  The Strand runs along the beaches and is used for cycling, running and rollerblading.

See also

Redondo Beach pier
Hermosa Beach pier
Manhattan Beach pier

Gallery

References

Beaches of Southern California
Los Angeles County, California regions
Beaches of Los Angeles County, California
Manhattan Beach, California
Redondo Beach, California
South Bay, Los Angeles